Tell Me a Story is an American psychological thriller television anthology series created by Kevin Williamson for CBS All Access. Based on the Spanish television series Cuéntame un cuento, it depicts iconic fairy tales reimagined as modern-day thrillers. Each season features a mostly different cast ensemble, with Danielle Campbell and Paul Wesley appearing in both seasons of the series.

The first season premiered on October 31, 2018, and concluded on January 3, 2019, after 10 episodes. A second season was announced shortly before the first season ended, which premiered on December 5, 2019, and concluded on February 6, 2020, after another set of 10 episodes. In May 2020, the series was canceled after two seasons. Subsequently, the television broadcast rights to the series were picked up by The CW, where it premiered in July 2020 and aired through December 2020.

Premise
Tell Me a Story takes "the world's most beloved fairy tales and reimagines them as a dark and twisted psychological thriller. Set in modern-day New York City, the first season of this serialized drama interweaves The Three Little Pigs, Little Red Riding Hood and Hansel and Gretel into an epic and subversive tale of love, loss, greed, revenge, and murder."

The second season of the show, set in Nashville, Tennessee, reimagines the princess-themed tales Beauty and the Beast, Sleeping Beauty and Cinderella.

Had it been renewed, the third season would have included adaptations of Snow White, Jack and the Beanstalk and Rapunzel.

Cast and characters

Main

Season 1
James Wolk as Jordan Evans, a restaurateur in New York City who sets out to exact revenge against the men responsible for his fiancée's death. Jordan's fairy-tale counterpart is the Big Bad Wolf from The Three Little Pigs.
Billy Magnussen as Joshua "Nick" Sullivan, a high school teacher who engages in a relationship with one of his students. Nick's fairy-tale counterpart is the Wolf from Little Red Riding Hood.
Dania Ramirez as Hannah Perez, an Army veteran who returns to her hometown of New York City and who has issues with her mother and her stepfather. Hannah's fairy-tale counterpart is Gretel from Hansel and Gretel.
Danielle Campbell as Kayla Powell, a high school senior still processing her mother's death who recently moved to New York City with her father. Kayla's fairy-tale counterpart is Little Red Riding Hood from Little Red Riding Hood.
Dorian Crossmond Missick as Sam Reynolds, an NYPD detective who secretly leads a group of criminals. Sam's fairy-tale counterpart is the third little pig from The Three Little Pigs.
Sam Jaeger as Tim Powell, a widowed father who moves to New York City with his daughter following his wife's death. Tim's fairy-tale counterparts are Little Red Riding Hood's mother and the Woodcutter from Little Red Riding Hood.
Davi Santos as Gabe Perez, Hannah's brother who accidentally kills someone and who has a drug addiction. Gabe's fairy-tale counterpart is Hansel from Hansel and Gretel.
Michael Raymond-James as Mitch Longo, a blue-collar worker who struggles to provide for his wife and occasionally pulls off crimes with his brother Eddie. Mitch's fairy-tale counterpart is the second little pig from The Three Little Pigs.
Zabryna Guevara as Renee Garcia, a detective with the New York Police Department.
Paul Wesley as Eddie Longo, a bartender and low-level drug dealer and Mitch's brother who operates as a part-time thief to pay off his debts. Eddie's fairy-tale counterpart is the first little pig from The Three Little Pigs.
Kim Cattrall as Colleen Powell, a former chorus girl and Tim's mother. Colleen's fairy-tale counterpart is Little Red Riding Hood's grandmother from Little Red Riding Hood.

Season 2
Paul Wesley as Tucker Reed, an aspiring writer trying to prove his worth who struggles with a dark and catastrophic secret. Tucker's fairy-tale counterpart is The dark fairy from Sleeping Beauty.
Odette Annable as Madelyn "Maddie" Pruitt, the peace-keeping, overachieving middle child in a broken family. Maddie's fairy-tale counterpart is the Prince from Sleeping Beauty.
Danielle Campbell as Olivia Moon, a self-absorbed school-oriented girl who moves to Nashville to further her career, but will have to really show her strength for survival. Olivia's fairy-tale counterpart is sleeping beauty from Sleeping Beauty.
Matt Lauria as Jackson Pruitt, the black sheep of a family who is torn between his demons and the desire to be a better man. Jackson's fairy-tale counterpart is the Prince from Cinderella.
Eka Darville as Beau Morris, a police officer who struggles to navigate his new reality after his adherence to a moral code blows up both his personal and professional life. Beau's fairy-tale counterpart is Beauty from Beauty and the Beast.
Natalie Alyn Lind as Ashley Rose Pruitt, a rising country music star who survives a brutal attack, then confines herself to her home. Ashley's fairy-tale counterpart is the Beast from Beauty and the Beast.
Ashley Madekwe as Simone Garland, a mysterious young woman who is forced to come face-to-face with the life she purposefully left behind and will put her own life in danger to uncover her family's dark secrets. Simone's fairy-tale counterpart is Cinderella from Cinderella.
Carrie-Anne Moss as Rebecca Pruitt, Ashley's mother and a single mother of three who faces relationship problems with her children, and who finally starts to live for herself.

Recurring

Season 1

Paulina Singer as Laney Reed, a classmate of Kayla's whom she quickly befriends and shares her secrets with.
Kurt Yaeger as Terry, Hannah's veteran friend from the war who is disabled, but still sharp at his craft for long-range shooting. He joins forces with Hannah against the people who threaten her. 
Becki Newton as Katrina Thorne, the manager of the hotel where Tim works, and later his girlfriend. She also harbors secrets of her own, each with their own deadly goals. Katrina's fairy-tale counterpart is the Witch from Hansel and Gretel.
Spencer Grammer as Beth, Jordan's girlfriend who was killed and later guides him on his quest as a figment of his imagination.
Rarmian Newton as Ethan Davies, a classmate of Kayla's who becomes obsessed with her and appears to have signs of a dangerous mental illness.
Justine Cotsonas as Carla, Eddie's girlfriend who he wants to run away with.
Tonya Glanz as Shelley, Mitch's wife who knows nothing of what he really did and who he is.
James Martinez as Olsen, a dirty cop working for Sam.
Debra Monk as Esther Thorne, Katrina's mother who works for her daughter in kidnapping and getting what she wants from their clients.
Luke Guldan as Billy, Gabe's friend and roommate who is also a stripper and sex worker who accidentally kills a powerful man.
Jennifer Ikeda as Rita, someone working with Jordan to find out who killed Beth.
Sanjit De Silva as Mark, someone working with Jordan to find out who killed Beth.
Dan Amboyer as Blake, a male stripper and sex worker who works with Billy and Gabe.
Polly Draper as Madeline, Hannah and Gabe's mother who abandoned them and their father many years ago, and who Hannah resents.
Claire Saunders as Vicki, a friend of Kayla.
David Andrews as Richard Winston, Hannah and Gabe's step-father who truly cares for them and wants to help them.
Elliot Villar as Detective Herrera, one of two cops who are investigating Beth's murder.
Quincy Chad as Detective Grant, one of two cops who are investigating Beth's murder.
Simone Missick as Mariana Reynolds, Sam's wife who is in the dark.

Season 2

Kathryn Prescott as Susie, Ashley Rose Pruitt's friend and assistant. 
Phillip Rhys as Damien Hewett, a slick, straight-shooting record executive to rising country music singer Ashley Rose Pruitt.
Casey Thomas Brown as Kyle Verafield, a man with a dark obsession for Ashley.
Evan Parke as Ken Morris, Beau's father who is hired by Ashley's label to protect her following her accident. Ken's fairy-tale counterpart is the Merchant from Beauty and the Beast.
Garcelle Beauvais as Veronica Garland, Simone's stepmother who is protective of her status and her two sons. Veronica's fairy-tale counterpart is the Wicked Stepmother from Cinderella.
Caleb Castille as Ron Garland, the smart, dominant older sibling to Derek. Ron's fairy-tale counterpart is one of the Wicked Stepsisters from Cinderella.
Christopher Meyer as Derek Garland, the soft-spoken, fiercely loyal younger sibling to Ron. Derek's fairy-tale counterpart is one of the Wicked Stepsisters from Cinderella.
Harry Shum Jr. as Brendan, a lawyer and Maddie's ex-boyfriend. 
Audrey Corsa as Taylor, a woman who has a hidden rage within and tries to protect her boyfriend after he does something horrible.
Julia Campbell as Cora, Simone's godmother. Cora's fairy-tale counterpart is the Fairy Godmother from Cinderella.
Felisha Terrell as Detective Gwen Roberts, Beau's old partner who is investigating Ashley's case.
Matt Walton as Clay Callaway, Simone's father's lawyer who is mysteriously involved in his death and with Veronica.
Karina Logue as Donna Kading, a woman who Jackson meets when he begins attending Alcoholics Anonymous.

Guest
Marguerite Moreau as Abby Powell, Kayla's mother who mysteriously died. (season 1)
Charles Esten as Ronnie Pruitt, Jackson, Ashley, and Maddie's deceased father who played music and was an alcoholic. He was especially close to Jackson. (season 2)

Episodes

Season 1 (2018–19)

Season 2 (2019–20)

Music
Musical performances were featured throughout the series' second season, all performed by Natalie Alyn Lind. On February 11, 2020, CBS All Access released the official soundtrack containing full versions of the second season's songs.

Season 2

Production

Development
On November 30, 2017, it was announced that CBS All Access had given Tell Me a Story a series order. The show is being developed for American audiences by Kevin Williamson and is based on the Spanish television series Érase una vez created by Marcos Osorio Vidal. Williamson is also set to write the series and executive produce it alongside Aaron Kaplan and Dana Honor. The series is being produced by Kaplan's production company Kapital Entertainment. On May 9, 2018, it was reported that Liz Friedlander would direct and executive produce the first two episodes. On December 17, 2018, it was announced that the series had been renewed for a second season. On May 11, 2020, the series was canceled after two seasons.

Casting
In May 2018, it was announced that Billy Magnussen and Kim Cattrall had been cast in the series' lead roles. In June 2018, it was reported that Danielle Campbell, Paul Wesley, James Wolk, Dania Ramirez, and Sam Jaeger had joined the main cast. In July 2018, it was announced that Davi Santos, Zabryna Guevara, and Dorian Missick had been cast in series regular roles. In August 2018, it was reported that Michael Raymond-James, Kurt Yaeger, Rarmian Newton, and Paulina Singer had joined the cast in a recurring capacity.

Filming
Principal photography for season one began on June 28, 2018, in New York City, New York. and ended in early November 2018. Filming for season two began on July 1, 2019 in Nashville, Tennessee, and wrapped on December 18, 2019.

Release
On August 5, 2018, it was announced during the Television Critics Association's annual summer press tour that the series would premiere on October 31, 2018. The second season premiered on December 5, 2019. The day of the series cancellation, The CW picked-up the television broadcast rights to the first two seasons. The first season premiered on July 28, 2020, followed by the second on October 13, 2020.

Marketing
On July 19, 2018, the series held a panel at San Diego Comic-Con in San Diego, California moderated by Entertainment Weeklys Henry Goldblatt and featuring executive producer Kevin Williamson as well as series stars Paul Wesley and James Wolk. The panel included the premiere of an exclusive teaser trailer for the series. On August 5, 2018, a "sneak peek" trailer for the series was released. On October 5, 2018, the official trailer for the series was released, first premiering during the series' panel at the annual New York Comic Con.

Premiere
On October 23, 2018, the series held its official premiere at the Metrograph theater in New York City, New York. Those in attendance included creator Kevin Williamson, executive producer Dana Honor, and cast members Becki Newton, Danielle Campbell, Dania Ramirez, and James Wolk.

Reception

Critical response
The series has been met with a mixed response from critics upon its premiere. Based on 15 reviews, the first season holds a 60% approval rating on Rotten Tomatoes with an average rating of 5.42 out of 10. The website's critical consensus reads, "Despite an enticing cast and promising premise, Tell Me a Storys overly plotted, grim take on Grimm's Fairy Tales fails to enchant." Metacritic, which uses a weighted average, assigned the series a score of 45 out of 100 based on 7 critics, indicating "mixed or average reviews".

In a positive review, Refinery29s Sesali Bowen commended the series saying, "Tell Me A Story captures its viewers to put themselves in the shoes of some of their favorite fables with its realism. So far it's better for it. This new CBS All Access program has enough to stand on without it thanks to an array of characters who are interesting if not a little cliche." In a more mixed critique, Varietys offered the series qualified praise saying, "For all its faults, the series is enthusiastically pulpy, moving with a propulsive energy that, to be frank, most streaming dramas lack. It's not nearly operating on the same prescient level as, say, The Good Fight, nor quite the radical re-imagining of fairy tales as advertised. But if nothing else, Tell Me a Story's got a wicked bite that might serve it well when trying to grab curious viewers on a streaming platform that doesn't quite have anything else like it." In an outright negative assessment, RogerEbert.coms Brian Tallerico criticized the series saying, "There are talented TV veterans in Tell Me a Story, likely lured by Williamson's pedigree, but even they fail to give what could reasonably be called good performances. The pacing, the dialogue, the (complete lack of) visual language, the world building—it's impossible to point to a single element that works."

Home media
The first season was released on DVD in Region 1 on October 1, 2019.

References

External links

2010s American anthology television series
2010s American drama television series
2018 American television series debuts
2020 American television series endings
2020s American anthology television series
2020s American drama television series
American television series based on Spanish television series
American thriller television series
Anthology web series
Paramount+ original programming
English-language television shows
Fiction about interracial romance
Television shows based on fairy tales
Television series created by Kevin Williamson
Television shows set in New York City
Psychological thriller web series
Works based on Hansel and Gretel
Works based on Little Red Riding Hood
Works based on The Three Little Pigs
Works based on Beauty and the Beast
Television series by Kapital Entertainment